Out of the Tiger's Mouth is a 1962 American drama film directed by Tim Whelan, Jr. It was entered into the 12th Berlin International Film Festival.

Cast
 Loretta Han-Yi Hwong as Little Moon
 David Fang as Peaceful
 Lilian Wai as Grandma Yang
 Y'ang Juo Ch'ing as Mme. Pang
 Mario Barri as Mario
 Lolita Shek as Su Mei
 Ngai Fung as Boatman Feng (as Fung Yi)
 Victoria Chan as Beggar girl

See also
List of American films of 1962

References

External links

1962 films
1962 drama films
American black-and-white films
American independent films
American drama films
1960s English-language films
1960s American films